Karayevo (Qaray) is a rural locality (a village) in Yakshimbetovsky Selsoviet, Kuyurgazinsky District, Bashkortostan, Russia. The population was 85 as of 2010. There is 1 street.

Geography 
Karayevo is located 32 km southwest of Yermolayevo (the district's administrative centre) by road. Abdulovo is the nearest rural locality.

References 

Rural localities in Kuyurgazinsky District